The 2004 Ugandan Super League was the 37th season of the official Ugandan football championship, the top-level football league of Uganda.

Overview
The 2004 Uganda Super League was contested by 16 teams and was won by SC Villa, while Tower Of Praise TV, Iganga Town Council FC, Mbale Heroes, Ruhinda FC, Old Timers FC and Moyo Town Council FC were relegated.

League standings

Leading goalscorer
The top goalscorers in the 2004 season were David Kiwanuka (Uganda Revenue Authority SC) and Robert Ssentongo (Simba FC) with 10 goals each.

Footnotes

External links
 Uganda - List of Champions - RSSSF (Hans Schöggl)
 Ugandan Football League Tables - League321.com

Ugandan Super League seasons
1
Uganda
Uganda